Atlético Nacional is an association football club based in Medellín that competes in the Categoría Primera A, the top level football league in Colombia. Atlético Nacional was founded in 1947 and (as of 2017) is one of the teams never to have been relegated from the top level of Colombian football. The club has won sixteen Categoría Primera A titles, three Copa Colombia and two Superliga Colombiana.

List of managers

References 

Atlético Nacional managers
Atletico Nacional
Atlético Nacional